Fabio Mazzeo (born 24 July 1983) is an Italian footballer who plays as a forward for Potenza.

Career
Mazzeo started his career at Salernitana. He then played for Serie C2 club Nocerina and Perugia of Serie C1.

In August 2009, Mazzeo left for Frosinone in Serie B on loan with Marco Martini and Massimo Perra moved to opposite direction.

After the bankruptcy of Perugia Calcio, he was signed by Cosenza. In January 2011 he was signed by Atletico Roma. Both clubs bankrupted at the end of season.

On 11 July 2011 he was signed by Barletta.

On 20 July 2012 he was signed by Nocerina.

On 12 August 2013, the forward comes back to Perugia, having signed a two-year contract with the Grifoni.

On 17 July 2019, he signed with Livorno for a reported £2,000 week contract. 

On 1 February 2021, his contract with Livorno was terminated by mutual consent, and he signed with Potenza as a free agent.

References

External links
 Lega Serie B profile 
 

Living people
1983 births
People from Salerno
Footballers from Campania
Association football forwards
Italian footballers
U.S. Salernitana 1919 players
A.S.G. Nocerina players
A.C. Perugia Calcio players
Frosinone Calcio players
Cosenza Calcio players
Atletico Roma F.C. players
A.S.D. Barletta 1922 players
Benevento Calcio players
Calcio Foggia 1920 players
U.S. Livorno 1915 players
Potenza Calcio players
Serie B players
Serie C players
Sportspeople from the Province of Salerno
21st-century Italian people